Gary Kreidt (born c. 1940) is an American politician. He is a member of the North Dakota House of Representatives from the 33rd District, serving since 2002. He is a member of the Republican party.

References

Living people
1940s births
Republican Party members of the North Dakota House of Representatives
21st-century American politicians